Group C of the 2000 Fed Cup Europe/Africa Zone Group I was one of four pools in the Europe/Africa Zone Group I of the 2000 Fed Cup. Four teams competed in a round robin competition, with the top team advancing to the knockout stage.

Belarus vs. Poland

Slovenia vs. Romania

Belarus vs. Morocco

Slovenia vs. Poland

Belarus vs. Romania

Poland vs. Morocco

Belarus vs. Slovenia

Romania vs. Morocco

Slovenia vs. Morocco

Romania vs. Poland

  failed to win any ties in the pool, and thus was relegated to Group II in 2001, where they placed last in their pool of four.

See also
Fed Cup structure

References

External links
 Fed Cup website

2000 Fed Cup Europe/Africa Zone